The 2018 BWF World Junior Championships (officially known as the Li-Ning BWF World Junior Championships 2018 for sponsorship reasons) was the twentieth edition of the BWF World Junior Championships. It was held in Markham, Canada at Markham Pan Am Centre from 5 to 18 November 2018. This was the second time Canada had hosted the Badminton World Junior Championships.

Host city selection
Canada was the only bidder for this event and the bid was approved by the Badminton World Federation in June 2017.

Medalists

Medal table

References

External links
Official website 

 
BWF World Junior Championships
International sports competitions hosted by Canada
Badminton tournaments in Canada
Sport in Markham, Ontario
Bwf World Junior Championships
Bwf World Junior Championships
Bwf World Junior Championships
Bwf World Junior Championships
Bwf World Junior Championships